Frederick Johnson was an English professional footballer who played in the Football League for Gainsborough Trinity as a right half.

Career statistics

References

1876 births
English footballers
English Football League players
Association football inside forwards
Southern Football League players
Year of death missing
Gainsborough Trinity F.C. players
Brentford F.C. players
Association football wing halves
Footballers from Staffordshire